United Technologies Corporation (UTC) was an American multinational conglomerate headquartered in Farmington, Connecticut.  It researched, developed, and manufactured products in numerous areas, including aircraft engines, aerospace systems, HVAC, elevators and escalators, fire and security, building automation, and industrial products, among others. UTC was also a large military contractor, getting about 10% of its revenue from the U.S. government. Gregory J. Hayes was the CEO and chairman.

In April 2020 UTC merged with the Raytheon Company to form Raytheon Technologies.

History

Pre-1970s

1970s and 1980s
In 1974, Harry Gray left Litton Industries to become the CEO of United Aircraft. He pursued a strategy of growth and diversification, changing the parent corporation's name to United Technologies Corporation (UTC) in 1975 to reflect the intent to diversify into numerous high tech fields beyond aerospace. (The change became official on May 1, 1975.) The diversification was partially to balance civilian business against any overreliance on military business. UTC became a mergers and acquisitions (M&A)–focused organization, with various forced takeovers of unwilling smaller corporations. The next year (1976), UTC forcibly acquired Otis Elevator. In 1979, Carrier Refrigeration and Mostek were acquired; the Carrier deal was forcible, while the Mostek deal was a white knight move against hostile takeover designs by Gould.

At one point, the military portion of UTC's business, whose sensitivity to "excess profits" and boom/bust demand drove UTC to diversify away from it, actually carried the weight of losses incurred by the commercial M&A side of the business. Although M&A activity was not new to United Aircraft, the M&A activity of the 1970s and 1980s was higher-stakes and arguably unfocused. Rather than aviation being the central theme of UTC businesses, high tech (of any type) was the new theme. Some Wall Street watchers questioned the true value of M&A at almost any price, seemingly for its own sake.

Mostek was sold in 1985 to the French electronics company Thomson.

In 2007, UTC opened the Hawk Works, a Rapid Prototyping and Military Derivatives Completion Center (RPMDCC) located west of the Elmira-Corning Regional Airport in Big Flats, New York.

In March 2008, UTC made a $2.63 billion bid to acquire Diebold, a Canton, Ohio based manufacturer of banking and voting machines. Diebold rejected the buyout bid as inadequate.

In April 2010, UTC announced that it was investing €15 million ($20 million) to set up the United Technologies Research Centre Ireland at University College Cork’s Tyndall National Institute which will carry out research on energy and security systems.

In June 2012, it was discovered that UTC sold military technology to the Chinese.  For pleading guilty to violating the Arms Export Control Act and making false statements, United Technologies and its subsidiaries were fined $75 million.
 
In February 2013, UTC Power was sold to ClearEdge Power.

In October 2014, Toshiba and United Technologies made a deal to expand their joint venture outside Japan.
 
In February 2016, UTC subsidiary Carrier Air Conditioner announced to employees at its Indianapolis and Huntington plants, that Carrier is moving manufacturing to Mexico: "The best way to stay competitive and protect the business for long-term is to move production from our facility in Indianapolis to Monterrey, Mexico. "  In December, Carrier agreed to keep the Indianapolis plant open, keeping 700 jobs in Indianapolis. The plant in Huntington, Indiana would still close their doors, leaving 700 employees jobless.

In June 2019, United Technologies announced the intention to merge with defense contractor Raytheon to form Raytheon Technologies Corporation. The combined company, valued at more than $100 billion after planned spinoffs, would be the world's second-largest aerospace-and-defense company by sales behind Boeing. Although UTC will be the nominal survivor, the merged company will be headquartered in Waltham, Massachusetts, where Raytheon is based. The merger was completed in April 2020.

In March 2020, United Technologies Corporation announced the separations of Carrier Global and Otis Worldwide.

Executive history 
In April 2008, Louis Chênevert succeeded George David as the company's chief executive officer (CEO).  Chênevert served until 2014, when he was succeeded by Gregory Hayes.

The chief financial officer's (CFO) position was held by Gregory Hayes until 2014, when he succeeded Louis Chênevert as CEO. 
The chairman of the board of directors (Chairperson) position went to Louis Chênevert, then the company's CEO, in January 2010, succeeding George David.

Finances 
For the fiscal year 2017, United Technologies reported earnings of US$4.552 billion, with an annual revenue of US$59.837 billion, an increase of 4.5% over the previous fiscal cycle. United Technologies shares traded at over $114 per share, and its market capitalization was valued at US$98.6 billion in October 2018. UTC ranked No. 51 in the 2018 Fortune 500 list of the largest United States corporations by total revenue.

Business units

 Otis Elevator Company: Manufacturer, installer, and servicer of elevators, escalators, and moving walkways.
 Pratt & Whitney: Designs and builds aircraft engines and gas turbines.
Pratt & Whitney Canada
 Collins Aerospace: Designs and manufactures aerospace systems for commercial, regional, corporate and military aircraft; a major supplier for international space programs.  Provides industrial products for the hydrocarbon, chemical, and food processing industries, construction and mining companies. Collins Aerospace was formed following UTC's acquisition of Rockwell Collins in 2018, by combining the newly acquired business with UTC Aerospace Systems, which itself was the result of a 2012 merger of Hamilton Sundstrand and the Goodrich Corporation.
 UTC Climate, Controls & Security:  Makes fire detection and suppression systems, access control systems, and security alarm systems; provides security system integration and monitoring services.
Carrier: A global manufacturer of heating, ventilation, air conditioning, and refrigeration systems.
 NORESCO
Chubb: a fire and security systems manufacturer. 
 United Technologies Research Center (UTRC): A centralized research facility that supports all UTC business units in developing new technologies and processes.

Acquisitions
1999: Sundstrand Corporation, merged  into UTC's Hamilton Standard unit to form Hamilton Sundstrand.
2003,  Chubb Security.
2004,   Schweizer Aircraft Corporation  planned to be operated as a wholly owned subsidiary under their Sikorsky Aircraft division.
2005,  Kidde. 
2005,   Boeing's Rocketdyne division, which was merged into the Pratt & Whitney business unit and renamed Pratt & Whitney Rocketdyne (later sold to Aerojet) and merged into Aerojet Rocketdyne.
2008,NORESCO, an energy service company, acquired by  UTC's Carrier Corporation  d 
2009, a 49.5% stake in Clipper Windpower for $206 million. In  2010, UTC agreed with Clipper to acquire the rest of the company.
2010  General Electric's security equipment business for US$1.8 billion,  to support UTC's Fire & Security unit.
2011, UTC acquired a $18.4 billion deal (including $1.9 billion in net debt assumed) for aircraft components maker Goodrich Corporation.
2012, United Technologies acquired Goodrich and merged it with Hamilton Sundstrand; the resulting organization is UTC Aerospace Systems
2015, UTC Building & Industrial Systems completed the acquisition of CIAT Group, a leading HVAC manufacturing company in France.  In November, Lockheed Martin completed its $9.0 billion acquisition of Sikorsky Aircraft.
2017, UTC proposed to acquire Rockwell Collins in cash and stock for $23 billion, $30 billion including Rockwell Collins' net debt, for $500+ million of synergies expected by year four. In 2018, the company announced the Rockwell Collins deal had closed, and that it will split into three independent companies. Pratt and Whitney and the newly formed Collins Aerospace will remain under United Technologies, while Otis Elevator and UTC Climate, Controls & Security (doing business as Carrier) will be spun off as two independent companies.

Former businesses
Kidde: a leading manufacturer of residential smoke alarms, carbon monoxide (CO) alarms and fire extinguishers. (now a subsidiary of UTC spin-off, Carrier
 Clipper Windpower: A maker of wind turbines. In December 2010 Clipper Windpower was acquired by United Technologies Corporation. It was sold in 2012 to Platinum Equity LLC.
 Hamilton Standard: which became part of Hamilton Sundstrand, now part of UTC Aerospace Systems.
 Hamilton Test Systems, an Arizona-based developer of vehicle emission test equipment, which was sold to Georgetown Partners in December 1990, which renamed it Envirotest Systems Corp.  It is now part of Environmental Systems Products Holdings (ESPH).
 Inmont: paint and resins, which was later sold to BASF
 Mostek semiconductor: from 1979 to 1985
 Norden Systems: a corporation that manufactures electronics systems for military use, now a part of Northrop Grumman. Acquired in 1958, sold in 1994.
 Pratt & Whitney Rocketdyne: sold in June 2013 and now part of GenCorp
 Sikorsky Aircraft: maker of helicopters for commercial, industrial, institutional, government, and military use; now a part of Lockheed Martin
PZL Mielec
 Turbo Power and Marine Systems, Inc: a manufacturer of simple-cycle electrical power generation units of 25 MW and 50 MW. Renamed Pratt & Whitney Power Systems in 2000, sold to Mitsubishi Heavy Industry in May 2013 and is now a MHI group company named PW Power Systems, Inc.
 UT Automotive: now a division of Lear Corporation
 UT Communications: bought Lexar and Stromberg Carlson, makers of telephone equipment, which were later sold to Memorex in 1985.
 UTC Power: a manufacturer of distributed power generation systems and fuel cells for commercial, transportation, and space and defense applications. It was sold to ClearEdge Power in February 2013.

Political contributions
During the 2004 election cycle, UTC was the sixth largest defense industry donor to political campaigns, contributing a total of $789,561; 64%  went to Republicans. 
In the 2006 election cycle, UTC was again  the sixth largest donor to federal candidates and political parties;  53% of the funds were contributed to Republicans, 35% percent to Democrats;

In 2005, the firm was among 53 entities that contributed the maximum of $250,000 to the second inauguration of President George W. Bush.

Philanthropy
In 1981, a contribution from UTC made possible the exhibition "Paris/Magnum: Photographs 1935–1981", featuring photographs of Paris taken by photographers of Magnum Photos, the agency founded in 1947 by Robert Capa, George Rodger, Henri Cartier-Bresson, William Vandivert, and David Seymour.  A volume of the same title, with text by Irwin Shaw and an introduction by Inge Morath, was also published in 1981.

UTC is the sponsor of the exhibition "Aphrodite and the Gods of Love" at Boston's Museum of Fine Arts that opened in fall 2011.

The firm and its subsidiaries are major contributors to museums such as the New England Air Museum.

In April 2015, UTC signed an education partnership agreement with the China Friendship Foundation for Peace and Development, a united front organization under the control of the Chinese People's Association for Friendship with Foreign Countries.

Environmental record
Researchers at the University of Massachusetts Amherst have identified UTC. as the 38th-largest corporate producer of air pollution in the United States as of 2008.

In the 2016 University of Massachusetts Amherst Toxic 100 Air Polluters Index, UTC was ranked 9th by a toxicity population exposure score. It was also reported they release  of toxins into the air.

See also

 Top 100 US Federal Contractors
 Honor Award from the National Building Museum
 Yuzuru Ito

References

Bibliography

External links

 UTC website

 
American companies established in 1929
Companies based in Hartford County, Connecticut
Farmington, Connecticut
Former components of the Dow Jones Industrial Average
Companies formerly listed on the New York Stock Exchange
Conglomerate companies of the United States
Engineering companies of the United States
Manufacturing companies based in Connecticut
Manufacturing companies established in 1929
Multinational companies headquartered in the United States
Technology companies established in 1929
Conglomerate companies established in 1929
American companies disestablished in 2020
Technology companies disestablished in 2020
Manufacturing companies disestablished in 2020
2020 mergers and acquisitions